Giovanni Hoffmann (c. 1770 — ?) was a composer and mandolinist  who dwelled in Vienna, c. 1800, and has works preserved in the Austrian Gesellschaft der Musikfreunde archives in Vienna. Konrad Wölki said that he produced an "extensive creative output," for mandolin with other instruments, to include duets, a concerto, "quartets, divertimenti, sonatas and further works in different forms."

Almost nothing is known of him save that several compositions for mandolin in the Gesellschaft der Musikfreunde bear his name.  Some bear a publication date of 1799.  It is presumed that "Giovanni" is an Italianization of the name "Johann", but this cannot be proven.  A concerto for mandolin and a quartet, the latter in an arrangement, have been recorded.

Works
Three duets for mandolin and violin (Opus 1)
Three duets for mandolin and violin (Opus 2)
Sonata in D minor for mandolin and guitar
Sonata in C major for mandolin and bass
Concerto for mandolin and orchestra in D major (strings and wind)

References

"Giovanni Hoffmann". In David Mason Greene, Biographical Encyclopedia of Composers.  Garden City, New York; Doubleday & Company, Inc., 1985, .

1770s births
Year of death missing
Austrian male composers
Austrian mandolinists
Classical mandolinists